Hassanabad, Qanat Nasi is a village in Cheshmeh Ziarat Rural District, in the Central District of Zahedan County, Sistan and Baluchestan Province, Iran. At the 2006 census, its population was 58, in 10 families.

References 

Populated places in Zahedan County